Innstrandens Idrettslag is a Norwegian sports club from Bodø, Nordland. It has sections for association football, volleyball, handball, praralympics and Nordic skiing.

The club was founded on 8 August 1920. 

The men's football team currently plays in the Third Division, the fourth tier of Norwegian football. It last played in the Norwegian Second Division in 2005. After the 2001, 2003 and 2007 seasons it contested playoffs to win promotion, but failed (it did succeed after the 2004 season, but was relegated straight back).

Innstrandens IL has app. 1.300 members.

Recent history
{|class="wikitable"
|-bgcolor="#efefef"
! Season
!
! Pos.
! Pl.
! W
! D
! L
! GS
! GA
! P
!Cup
!Notes
|-
|2005
|D2
|align=right bgcolor=red|14
|align=right|26||align=right|5||align=right|4||align=right|17
|align=right|30||align=right|50||align=right|19
|1st round 
|Relegated to 3. Division
|-
|2006
|D3
|align=right bgcolor=silver|2
|align=right|22||align=right|15||align=right|4||align=right|3
|align=right|107||align=right|38||align=right|49
|1st qualifying round 
|
|-
|2007
|D3
|align=right bgcolor=gold|1
|align=right|22||align=right|18||align=right|2||align=right|2
|align=right|102||align=right|22||align=right|56
|1st round
|
|-
|2008
|D3
|align=right |5
|align=right|22||align=right|12||align=right|2||align=right|8
|align=right|62||align=right|42||align=right|37
|1st qualifying round 
|
|-
|2009
|D3
|align=right bgcolor=silver|2
|align=right|20||align=right|12||align=right|5||align=right|3
|align=right|63||align=right|33||align=right|41
|2nd qualifying round 
|
|-
|2010
|D3
|align=right bgcolor=cc9966|3
|align=right|22||align=right|13||align=right|2||align=right|7
|align=right|63||align=right|45||align=right|41
|1st round
|
|-
|2011 
|D3
|align=right |8
|align=right|22||align=right|6||align=right|3||align=right|13
|align=right|33||align=right|67||align=right|21
|1st qualifying round 
|
|-
|2012
|D3
|align=right |10
|align=right|22||align=right|7||align=right|5||align=right|10
|align=right|38||align=right|51||align=right|26
|1st qualifying round 
|
|-
|2013 
|D3
|align=right |12
|align=right|22||align=right|3||align=right|1||align=right|18
|align=right|28||align=right|88||align=right|10
|1st qualifying round
|
|-
|2014 
|D3
|align=right bgcolor=red|11
|align=right|22||align=right|4||align=right|3||align=right|15
|align=right|38||align=right|52||align=right|15
|1st qualifying round
|Relegated to 4. Division
|-
|2015 
|D4
|align=right bgcolor=silver|2
|align=right|18||align=right|12||align=right|2||align=right|4
|align=right|62||align=right|29||align=right|38
|1st qualifying round
|
|-
|2016 
|D4
|align=right bgcolor=silver|2
|align=right|18||align=right|14||align=right|2||align=right|2
|align=right|67||align=right|15||align=right|44
|1st qualifying round
|
|-
|2017 
|D4
|align=right |7
|align=right|20||align=right|7||align=right|3||align=right|10
|align=right|35||align=right|58||align=right|24
|1st qualifying round
|
|-
|2018 
|D4
|align=right |7
|align=right|16||align=right|5||align=right|3||align=right|8
|align=right|28||align=right|37||align=right|18
|1st qualifying round
|
|-
|2019 
|D4
|align=right |6
|align=right|16||align=right|7||align=right|0||align=right|9
|align=right|37||align=right|25||align=right|21
|2nd qualifying round
|
|}

References

 Official site 

Football clubs in Norway
Sport in Bodø
1920 establishments in Norway
Association football clubs established in 1920
Athletics clubs in Norway